Elections to Wigan Council were held on 4 May 2006. One-third of the council was up for election and the Labour party kept overall control of the council. Overall turnout was 29.2%.

Election result

This result had the following consequences for the total number of seats on the Council after the elections:

Ward results

References

2006 English local elections
2006
2000s in Greater Manchester